From 1754 to 1756, the Duke of Newcastle headed the government of Great Britain. After the death of the previous prime minister, his brother Henry Pelham, Newcastle had formed a new administration of Whigs. He remained in power until 1756 when his government collapsed following the fall of Minorca and the fierce criticism that he had come under for his handling of the Seven Years' War that was engulfing Europe.

Among the most influential members of the first Newcastle ministry was Henry Fox, who served as Leader of the House of Commons from November 1755, having initially entered the Cabinet in his earlier position of Secretary at War in December 1754.

Ministry
It is unclear who was a member of the Cabinet.

See also
 11th Parliament of Great Britain
 1754 British general election
 Great Britain in the Seven Years' War

Notes

References

 
 
 

British ministries
Government
1754 establishments in Great Britain
1756 disestablishments in Great Britain
1750s in Great Britain
Ministries of George II of Great Britain